Sasakura Dam is a gravity dam located in Shimane Prefecture in Japan. The dam is used for flood control. The catchment area of the dam is 13.5 km2. The dam impounds about 5  ha of land when full and can store 556 thousand cubic meters of water. The construction of the dam was completed in 1967.

References

Dams in Shimane Prefecture
1967 establishments in Japan